Raúl González (born 20 February 1957) is a Cuban weightlifter. He competed in the men's lightweight event at the 1980 Summer Olympics.

References

1957 births
Living people
Cuban male weightlifters
Olympic weightlifters of Cuba
Weightlifters at the 1980 Summer Olympics
Place of birth missing (living people)
20th-century Cuban people